Balantidium is a genus of ciliates. It contains the parasitic species Balantidium coli, the only known cause of balantidiasis.

History
The first-described species of Balantidium, B. entozoon, was described in 1838 by Ehrenberg as a member of the genus Bursaria. Balantidium coli observed in patients with dysentery was originally described as Paramecium coli by Malmstein in 1857. In 1858, Edouard Claparède and Johannes Lachmann created the genus Balantidium and reclassified B. entozoon as its type species. Stein in 1863 reclassified Paramecium coli into the genus Balantidium.

Transcriptomics
Transcriptome data for Balantidium ctenopharyngodoni, from single-cell transcriptome sequencing, were published in 2017 and were the first omics data within the subclass Trichostomatia.

Taxonomy
A separate genus – Neobalantidium – has been created for several of these species. Balantidium coli is one of the species that has been reclassified. It has also been proposed that it is a junior synonym of genus Balantioides which has B. coli as the type species.

The closest known relative of this genus is Buxtonella sulcata, a parasite of cattle.

Species
There are 72 species in the genus.

References

Ciliate genera
Litostomatea